Diploglottis is a genus of 10 species of trees known to science, constituting part of the plant family Sapindaceae. They grow naturally in rainforests and margins of adjoining humid forests in eastern Australia and New Guinea. Some species are known as native tamarind or small-leaved tamarind; they have no direct relationship with the true tamarind.

One Australian species, D. australis is grown as a street tree in the Northern Rivers area of New South Wales, principally Lismore and is known locally as the native tamarind.

Another endemic Australian species is D. campbellii, also known as the small-leaved tamarind, is rare and threatened and is restricted to a small number of sites each with a maximum of three trees per site. There are a total of 42 known mature wild trees in south-east Queensland and north-eastern New South Wales.  However, the tree, as a seedling, is readily available from nurseries in the Northern Rivers area of New South Wales, and in south-eastern Queensland. The small-leaved tamarind grows to 30 metres and has a compact canopy, making it good to use as a screening tree. It has small three-lobed fruit capsules. The fruit is edible and is commercially produced as bushfood. It is red when ripe and can be made into jam.

Naming and classification

The species currently known as D. australis was the first that European scientists collected specimens of, for instance botanist Robert Brown in 1804. Before formal naming, this species was grown up to a flowering tree in a glasshouse in Kew gardens, UK. In 1862 Joseph Dalton Hooker first established this genus name Diploglottis in Genera Plantarum  and the following year George Bentham formally published the D. cunninghamii name combination. Earlier in 1831 however, George Don had published a formal description of this taxon named with the epithet australis, with a different name genus. In 1878–9 Ludwig A. T. Radlkofer published his referral of this taxon to the name combination Diploglottis australis. In 1986 Gwen Harden and Lawrie Johnson published the clarification of the further involved history of these names. Sally T. Reynolds had proposed D. cunninghamii as the correct name in 1981. Harden and Johnson clarified that D. australis legitimately has support as the correct name, for this type species.

In 1978 P. W. Leenhouts described the new species D. bracteata.
In 1981 and 1987 Reynolds described several different new species.
In 1985 Reynolds’ account of the genus in Australia was published in the Flora of Australia volume 25.
In 1994 in Flora Malesiana P. W. Leenhouts included D. australis occurring in New Guinea, however the record has been corrected to the superficially similar D. diphyllostegia which in Australia also grows in areas adjacent to New Guinea and further north than the northernmost D. australis records.

Species
D. australis ; syn: D. cunninghamii ; Native tamarind – E. NSW, Qld, Australia
D. bernieana  – NE. Qld, Australia
D. bracteata  – NE. Qld, Australia
D. campbellii ; Small-leaved tamarind – SE. Qld, NE. NSW, Australia
D. diphyllostegia ; syn: D. cunninghamii var. diphyllostegia – C. to NE. Qld, Australia, New Guinea (–as D. australis)
D. harpullioides  – NE. Qld, Australia
D. macrantha  – NE. Qld, Australia
D. obovata  – C. Qld, Australia
D. pedleyi  – NE. Qld, Australia
D. smithii  – NE. Qld, Australia

Ecological connections

Diploglottis species are used as food plants by the hepialid moths Aenetus ramsayi and Aenetus scotti.

References

Cited works

External links

Flora of Queensland
Flora of New South Wales
Flora of New Guinea
Flora of Papua New Guinea
Flora of New Caledonia
Flora of Malesia
Sapindaceae genera
Sapindales of Australia
 
Taxa named by Joseph Dalton Hooker